The Terry Fox Theatre is a proscenium theatre in Port Coquitlam, British Columbia, opened in 1999, named after cancer research activist Terry Fox. Although attached to Terry Fox Secondary School, the theatre is operated as a stand-alone facility by the Port Coquitlam Theatre Society, a registered federal charity governed by a volunteer board of directors.

Overview 
The theatre has 336 seats, with 234 seats at orchestra level, and 102 seats on the balcony.

External links 
 Official site

References 

Terry Fox
Theatres in British Columbia
Port Coquitlam
Music venues in British Columbia